Dysderocrates is a genus of  woodlouse hunting spiders that was first described by Christa L. Deeleman-Reinhold & P. R. Deeleman in 1988.

Species
 it contains eight species:
Dysderocrates egregius (Kulczyński, 1897) – Hungary, Romania
Dysderocrates gasparoi Deeleman-Reinhold, 1988 – Greece (Corfu)
Dysderocrates kibrisensis Gücel, Charalambidou, Göçmen & Kunt, 2019 – Cyprus
Dysderocrates marani (Kratochvíl, 1937) – Greece (Crete)
Dysderocrates regina Deeleman-Reinhold, 1988 – Turkey
Dysderocrates silvestris Deeleman-Reinhold, 1988 – Bosnia-Hercegovina, Montenegro
Dysderocrates storkani (Kratochvíl, 1935) (type) – SE Europe (Balkans)
Dysderocrates tanatmisi Karakaş Kiliç & Özkütük, 2017 – Turkey

References

Spiders of Europe
Araneomorphae genera
Dysderidae